Plomion is a commune in the Aisne department in Hauts-de-France in northern France.

History

Plomion was the site of a massacre by retreating German forces on the evening of August 31, 1944 as the American army approached pushing toward the Belgian border. Sixty German Waffen SS members who had been quartered in the village for six days, murdered fourteen men rounded-up at random and shot them with machine guns after lining them up in a meadow prior to retreating. Five men from a single family were dragged from their home during supper. The ages of the victims ranged from 70 to 17. After murdering the men, they set part of the town on fire. American troops arrived the following morning and their early arrival was credited by residents with preventing further murders.

Population

Sport
Plomion has been host to the French Sidecarcross Grand Prix in the past and hosted it again in 2010, on 2 May.

See also
 Communes of the Aisne department

References

Communes of Aisne
Aisne communes articles needing translation from French Wikipedia